This is a list of German television related events from 1962.

Events
17 February - Conny Froboess is selected to represent Germany at the 1962 Eurovision Song Contest with her song "Zwei kleine Italiener". She is selected to be the seventh German Eurovision entry during Deutsche Schlager-Festspiele held at the Kurhus in Baden-Baden.

Debuts
 3 January –  (1962)

Television shows

1950s
Tagesschau (1952–present)

Ending this year

Births

Deaths